The crooked worm lizard (Amphisbaena camura) is a worm lizard species in the genus Amphisbaena.

Geographic range
A. camura is found in Bolivia, Brazil, and Paraguay.

References

Further reading
Cope ED (1862). "Catalogues of the REPTILES obtained during the Explorations of the Parana, Paraguay, Vermejo and Uruguay [sic] Rivers, by Capt. Thos. J. Page, U. S. N.; and of those procured by Lieut. N. Michler, U. S. Top. Eng., Commander of the Expedition conducting the Survey of the Atrato River. Proc. Acad. Nat. Sci. Philadelphia 14: 346-359 + errata and addenda on p. 594. (Amphisbæna camura, new species, p. 350.)

camura
Reptiles described in 1862
Taxa named by Edward Drinker Cope